Archery competitions at the 2022 South American Games in Asuncion, Paraguay were held between October 2 and 5, 2022 at the Archery National Center.

A total of 10 events were contested (four men's, four women's and two mixed). A total of 12 NOC's entered teams into one or both competitions. The gold medalists in each individual event qualified a quota spot for the 2023 Pan American Games archery competitions.

Medal summary

Medal table

Medalists

Men

Women

Mixed

References

External links
Results book

Archery
South American Games
2022
Qualification tournaments for the 2023 Pan American Games